Tarzan and the Leopard Woman is a 1946 action film based on the Tarzan character created by Edgar Rice Burroughs and portrayed by Johnny Weissmuller. Directed by Kurt Neumann, film sees Tarzan encounter a tribe of leopard-worshippers. It was shot in the Los Angeles County Arboretum and Botanic Garden. Its plot has nothing in common with Burroughs' 1935 novel Tarzan and the Leopard Men.

Plot

Travelers near Zambezi are being killed, apparently by leopards.  The commissioner (Dennis Hoey) asks Tarzan to look into the matter.  Tarzan immediately doubts that leopards are the problem.  At the same time, Tarzan, Jane, and Boy take in Kimba, a boy who claims to have become lost in the jungle.  Kimba (Tommy Cook) is the brother of Queen Lea, leader of a leopard cult.  She has dispatched him to spy on Tarzan.  Queen Lea also conspires with Ameer Lazar (Edgar Barrier), a Western-educated doctor who resents the West's domination of the area.

Kimba has a goal of his own:  to take the heart of Jane (Brenda Joyce) a deed that would make him a warrior in the eyes of the cult.  The Leopard Men wear leopard skins that form a cowl and cape, with iron claws attached to the back of each hand.  Queen Lea (Acquanetta) wears a headband, wrist bands, ankle bands, halter top and miniskirt made of leopard skin.  As "Variety" put it:  "She displays plenty of what it takes to stir male interest and handles her acting chores adequately."  She works her followers into a frenzy in an underground chamber, "These skins are your disguise.  These claws are your weapons.  Go not as men, but as leopards.  Go swiftly, silently."

They attack a caravan bringing four young teachers (Iris Flores, Lillian Molieri (Miss Central America of 1945), Helen Gerald and Kay Solinas) and bring the maidens back for sacrifice.  They also capture Tarzan, Jane, and Boy.  Tarzan brings down the roof of the cavern, destroying the cult and rescuing his friends.

The plot is summed up by these lines spoken by Tarzan (about Cheeta): "If an animal can act like a man, why not a man like an animal?"

Cast 

Johnny Weissmuller as Tarzan
Brenda Joyce as Jane
Johnny Sheffield as Boy
Acquanetta as Lea, the High Priestess
Dennis Hoey as Commissioner  
Tommy Cook as Kimba
Anthony Caruso as Mongo 
George J. Lewis as Corporal (uncredited)
Doris Lloyd as Miss Wetherby, School Superintendent (uncredited) 
Ken Terrell as Leopard Man (uncredited)

Critical reception 
Writing in DVD Talk, critic Paul Mavis described the film as "[c]ompletely ridiculous fun" and "straight-faced in its overripe campiness," further noting that "[e]ven funnier is harried Tarzan's domestic situation, where Jane, like Blondie to Tarzan's Dagwood, is yapping and complaining about how the tree house is going to 'wrack and ruin' because Tarzan is too lazy to get up off his ass and fix the giant clamshell shower." In critic Jeremy Arnold's review for Turner Classic Movies, he wrote that the film "stands today as a satisfying, action-packed entry in the series," but noted that contemporary reviews in Variety and The New York Times were dismissive of the film's story, production values, directing, and acting.

References

External links

 
 
 ERBzine Silver Screen: Tarzan and the Leopard Woman
 Review of film at Variety

1946 films
1940s fantasy films
American fantasy films
American sequel films
Films directed by Kurt Neumann
Jungle girls
Tarzan films
Films produced by Sol Lesser
American black-and-white films
Films scored by Paul Sawtell
1940s English-language films
1940s American films